Friends Development Football Club  is a football club based in Laos. It was previously known as Pheuanphatthana FC until 2012. They play in the Lao League, the top national football league in Laos.

References

Football clubs in Laos